European route E46 forms part of the International E-road network. The route begins in Cherbourg-en-Cotentin, France, and ends in Liège, Belgium.

Route 
Cherbourg-Octeville - Caen - Rouen - Beauvais - Compiegne - Soissons - Reims - Charleville-Mézières - Liège

References

External links 

 UN Economic Commission for Europe: Overall Map of E-road Network (2007)

46
E046
E046
Cherbourg-en-Cotentin
Liège